Lawrence Frederick "Bob" Roberts (1 July 1903 – 8 March 1977) was a South African track and field athlete who competed in the 1924 Summer Olympics. In 1924 he finished eighth in the 1924 high jump event.

References

External links
profile

1903 births
1977 deaths
South African male high jumpers
Olympic athletes of South Africa
Athletes (track and field) at the 1924 Summer Olympics